Yosief Zeratsion (born 17 May 1990) is an Eritrean football goalkeeper. He has played for the Eritrea national football team.

International career
Zeratsion played in the 2009 CECAFA Cup in Kenya. He appeared in each group match, including the opening goalless draw with Zimbabwe, the 2–1 group match defeat to Rwanda, and the 3–1 group match win against Somalia.

References

Living people
1990 births
Eritrean footballers
Eritrea international footballers
Association football goalkeepers
Sportspeople from Asmara